The Rhode Island at-large congressional district is currently obsolete, with representation divided into two districts.

From 1790 to 1843, Rhode Island elected members to the United States House of Representatives at-large:
From 1790 to 1793, one member represented the state.
From 1793 to 1843, two members represented the state at-large.

List of members representing the district

Modern history 
Many 2020 census projections estimated Rhode Island would lose its second congressional district, bringing the at-large district back into existence. However, this proved not to be the case, and Rhode Island retained its current districts.

Notes

References 

 Congressional Biographical Directory of the United States 1774–present

At-large
Former congressional districts of the United States
At-large United States congressional districts
Constituencies established in 1790
1790 establishments in Rhode Island
Constituencies disestablished in 1843
1843 disestablishments in Rhode Island